Sanjiv Kumar or Sanjeev Kumar may refer to:

 Sanjeev Kumar, Indian actor.

 Sanjeev Kumar (field hockey) (born 1969), Indian Olympic hockey player
 Sanjiv Kumar, a politician from Bharatiya Janata Party in Uttar Pradesh, India.
 Sanjiv Kumar (politician), a politician from Jharkhand Mukti Morcha in Jharkhand, India.